Whitemark is a rural residential locality on Flinders Island in the local government area (LGA) of Flinders in the North-east LGA region of Tasmania. The 2016 census recorded a population of 301 for the state suburb of Whitemark.
It is the main settlement of Flinders Island.

Buildings
Whitemark has a local pub, called the Flinders Island Interstate Hotel.
It also has a post office, a supermarket, a bakery, a petrol station, a mechanic, and a library as well as small local produce businesses.

History
Whitemark was gazetted as a locality in 1970. The name may be derived from a conspicuous white mark placed by an early surveyor.
Whitemark Post Office opened  around 1902.

The Hydro Tasmania developed power supply for the settlement in the 1980s.

The local newspaper was the 'Island News' from 1954 to 2004.

Geography
The waters of Bass Strait form the western and south-western boundaries.

Road infrastructure 
Route B85 (Palana Road / Lady Barron Road) passes through from north-west to south.

References

Flinders Island
Towns in Tasmania